Cadorna FN is an underground interchange station in Milan, Italy, serving Lines 1 and 2 of the Milan Metro. The Line 1 station was opened on 1 November 1964 as part of the inaugural section of the Metro, between Sesto Marelli and Lotto. The Line 2 station was opened on 3 March 1978 as the southern terminus of the extension from Garibaldi FS. It served as the southern terminus of Line 2 until the extension of the line to Porta Genova on 30 October 1983.

The station is located at Piazzale Luigi Cadorna, opposite to Milano Cadorna railway station, within the municipal area of Milan. It is close to Sforzesco Castle, the Triennale and Parco Sempione.

References

External links
Cadorna underground station layout

Line 1 (Milan Metro) stations
Line 2 (Milan Metro) stations
Railway stations opened in 1964
1964 establishments in Italy
Railway stations in Italy opened in the 20th century